Compsoctena cossusella is a moth in the family Eriocottidae, first described by Francis Walker in 1856. It is found in Nepal.

Adults are cinereous (ash gray), speckled with brown. The forewings are rounded at the tips and transversely streaked with dark brown. There are four connected and very irregular brown patches in the exterior disk, and a fifth contiguous to the base of the interior border. The costa is brown towards the base.

References

Moths described in 1856
Compsoctena
Moths of Asia